The Tri-County Journal is owned by Pulitzer Publications, founded in 1878, the same owner as the St. Louis Post-Dispatch.  It covers the local news in Pacific, Eureka, Robertsville, Villa Ridge, Labadie, Catawissa, St. Clair, and Gray Summit.

The Tri-County Journal was formerly delivered free of charge to residents of Jefferson, Franklin, and St. Louis counties on Tuesdays.  The paper now requires a subscription.

External links
Tri-County Journal online

Newspapers published in Missouri
Publications established in 1878
1878 establishments in Missouri
Weekly newspapers published in the United States